Ronas Voe ( Shetland Dialect: Rønies Voe) is a voe in Northmavine, Shetland. It divides the land between Ronas Hill, Shetland's tallest mountain, and the Tingon peninsula. It is the second largest voe in Shetland, the largest being Sullom Voe. The townships of Heylor, Voe and Swinister are located on its shores, and the township of Assater is under a kilometre away.

Etymology 
Ronas Voe takes its name from Ronas Hill, which it lies adjacent to. Voe is a Shetland Dialect word for a fjord or inlet.

The name Ronas Hill has been attributed to a few different derivations. One of the earliest was suggested by P. A. Munch (who used the spelling Rooeness) - he claimed the name originates from the Old Norse roði or rauði (redness, referring to the red granite that characterises the area) and ness (headland), which he compared to the name and red rock found in Muckle Roe. This would make Ronas Voe Rauðanessvágr - vágr meaning inlet, thus "inlet of the red headland". However, Jakob Jakobsen denounced this, suggesting the name derives from the Old Norse hraun (a rough or rocky place, a wilderness). In the publication of his lecture on Shetland place names, Jakobsen used the spelling Rønis, and a footnote explicitly states "The spelling 'Roeness hill' (I need not speak of 'Ronas' hill at all) is erroneous." Ronas was the spelling adopted by Ordnance Survey in their first maps of the area published in 1881, and as such it has become the most commonly used English spelling. The justification for selecting this particular spelling was that Ronas was the "older form", and considering there was no consensus on which of the two previously described etymologies was correct, selecting it would "not commit [Ordnance Survey] to either supposition."

Before the standardisation of English orthography, Ronas Hill and Ronas Voe were referred to using a multitude of different spellings, even with different spellings being used within the same source. Some of the spellings include Renis, Rennis, Reniſſert, Renes, Reinsfelt, Renisfelt, Reinsfield, Ronisvo, Ronnes, Roones, Rona, Rona's, Rons, Ronaldi, Roeness, Rooeness, Ronise, Ronnis, Runnis, Runess, Rønis, Rønies, etc.

In some Dutch sources, Ronas Hill is referred to as the Blaeuwe or Blauwe Bergen (the "Blue Mountain"), while the noa-name for Ronas Hill used by some local fishermen is Bloberg, referring to its blue appearance at a far distance.

Geography 

Ronas Voe has been named Shetland's "only true fjord". The cliffs of Ronas Voe are the result of ancient glaciers cutting through a ridge of raised land. The cliffs at the Brough are an example of a roche moutonnée, in which the exposed rock has been sculpted by the passing glacier creating a smooth surface up-ice, and a rough exterior on the rock down-ice.

In August 2014 high amounts of rain resulted in a landslide that caused part of the road in Heylor to be temporarily blocked.

Beaches 
There are numerous beaches along the shore of Ronas Voe, including the Lang Ayre, Shetland's longest beach, and the Blade, which during the summer months is a nesting site for Arctic terns.

List of beaches 
Clockwise around the voe:
Lang Ayre
Slocka
The Shun
Ayre of Teogs
Orr Wick
Hollander's Ayre
The Blade
Sanda Cailla
Ships Ayre
Sannions Ayre

History

Battle of Ronas Voe 

On 14 March 1674 Ronas Voe was the site of the Battle of Ronas Voe, in which the Dutch East India Company ship Wapen van Rotterdam was captured by the English Royal Navy ships HMS Cambridge, HMS Newcastle and HMS Crown. From this event comes one of the earliest descriptions of Ronas Voe by Richard Carter, captain of Crown:"...in my letter to M[aste]r Pepys I have given a account of Cap[tai]n Wetwangs laboring the Dutch East India Shipp w[hi]ch was droue into Ronisvo a very good and sound harbor for 500 Sayle of Shipps of ye N[orth] W[es]t part of Shotland..."

The ornithologist's guide to the islands of Orkney and Shetland 

In 1831, ornithologist Robert Dunn visited Shetland to acquire specimens for his collection, and in 1837 published the notes from his trip "for the purpose of furnishing a guide to those who might be desirous of visiting these islands to collect specimens of Natural History". He spent a considerable portion of his stay living in Assater, exploring Ronas Voe and Ronas Hill multiple times.

After a first brief trip across the voe on his first day staying in Assater, he described the return from a second trip out of Ronas Voe:

... when we were about four miles from the mouth of the voe, a strong breeze of wind sprung up from the westward, the sea at the same time rising very rapidly; giving us sufficient warning to exert ourselves, and endeavour to get into a place of security as speedily as possible. For some time we pulled in a direct line for Rona's Voe, but the wind, which had sprung up very rapidly abeam, obliged us to alter our course, as the water threatened every moment to break into the boat; we therefore brought her head to the sea, intending, with the assistance of the oars, to keep her in this position, and weather out the gale. Not much liking the idea of remaining here any length of time exposed to the storm, I held a consultation with the boatmen as to the best mode of proceeding. Some were for making a fair wind of it, and advised that we should set sail and run for an inlet about eight miles distant, observing that it was nearly high water, and that when it began to ebb the sea would be still more highly agitated, and consequently the danger would be greater; others dissented from this opinion and were for taking to the oars again, for the purpose of getting into Rona's Voe. Thinking the latter plan the most advisable, we put the boat about and pulled for the voe. The tide was already ebbing, forming another obstacle, and we now had wind, tide, and sea to contend against. We got some shelter for a few minutes behind one of the large stacks, and during this respite baled out the boat, trimmed her as well as we could with the two seals I shot before the storm came on, set my son astride of them, and held the dog so as to keep the boat steady. I then asked the men if they thought they were able to pull the boat against wind and tide; they replied they would try, but the majority were for turning back to the other inlet, a proposition which I would not agree to. I now gave the men a glass of whiskey each and some biscuit, and proposed to make Rona's Inlet: this required a desperate effort. As there was another stack a little distance from the one we were sheltered under, and the sea by this time began to break very fearfully between them, I determined to wait for a 'lull', as the sailors call it, which there generally is after three or four seas. Each of us got an oar in his hands ready for the attempt; we counted the four seas, then pulled with all our strength, and got out from between the two stacks before the sea broke in again; and being now out of the greatest danger, we pulled on in this way for four miles, during which time such was our anxiety that I think there was not a word spoken by any one. The wind was blowing so strongly against us that we could not tell whether we were making any way or not. When we arrived in the voe we got shelter, and being both wet and fatigued, rested ourselves and took a little more spirits. Several seals had followed us; we could pay no attention to them at the time, but having now got into shelter, I prepared my guns, as I expected they would come around us; and I was not disappointed, for as soon as I had my gun ready, one came staring up at the stern of the boat, which I shot instantly. We now pulled to our landing-place, about two miles up the voe, and arrived at home about two o'clock in the morning. The people told us they never expected we had gone out of the voe in such a stormy day, and the fishermen at the fishing-station would not believe we had been on the west side of Rona's Hill and got safe on shore again in such a heavy gale of wind.Dunn's extensive shooting of the wildlife was apparent the following year (1832), as William Chapman Hewitson visited Shetland with a similar purpose to Dunn - to collect birds and their eggs for his own collection, for the Newcastle Museum and to be able to write his book British Oology. Hewitson visited Ronas Hill and wrote of his experience:
Our main object was to get some eggs of the Skua Gull...and had soon the pleasure of examining one of these fine birds, first on the wing and afterwards dead at our feet. We went to their head-quarters and were much disappointed in not seeing more of them. They were once abundant here but the last year a man of the name of Dunn, a bird stuffer from Hull, for his own private gain nearly extirpated this rare bird. We did not during the day see above 5 or 6 pairs.It is likely that Hewitson had been informed of Dunn by Mr Cheyne of Ollaberry, whom they had visited the previous day before their visit to Ronas Hill. Mr Cheyne's brother John Cheyne of Tangwick, the local laird, had the previous year hosted Dunn at his residence, sparing Dunn from spending a night in Stenness, Eshaness, in what Dunn described as "[a hut] hung inside and out with fish; the smell of some, in a state of putrefaction, being by no means an agreeable accompaniment". This was despite the fact Dunn described himself as being "well habituated to the living as well as dead nuisances infesting a Shetland hut." Dunn upon returning to Shetland several years later, was accused by John Cheyne of "thinning [the skua population] more than any other person", Dunn however claimed:...in this [John Cheyne] was certainly mistaken, as I did not take so many as to injure the breed; these gulls were however so scarce when I last visited the islands, that I had great difficulty in obtaining permission to visit the places where they breed, the landlord assigning as a reason for his refusal that the birds had almost become extinct, but allowed me, as a great favour, to shoot a single pair.Dunn's explanation for the decline in the skua population was that "several parties from the South travelled through Shetland, principally for amusement, and having fowling-pieces with them, destroyed indiscriminately every bird that came within their reach", as well as mentioning "a great number were also shot by the officers of a cutter which was stationed in Rona's Voe for two or three months."

Return of the whaleship Diana 
 In 1866, the whaleship Diana of Hull set out on a voyage in search of whales and seals, and became trapped in ice for many months in the Davis Strait between Greenland and Canada. The crew's supplies were not sufficient to last them the extended time, meaning many of the crew became gradually more ill with scurvy and fatigue. The ship did eventually break free of the ice on 17 March 1867 and after what was termed "a race with death" in the publication of the ship's surgeon's diaries, Diana made its first landfall following the ordeal in Ronas Voe.

On 2 April 1867 at 11am, the remaining crew who were able enough to work the ship limped it into Ronas Voe. As they entered, eight corpses lay on the deck, and only two of the crew were able to make their way above deck to call for help. Six local men were taken aboard to work the ship's pumps, as the ship was taking on water at a significant rate and the crew were too fatigued to exert themselves. Two crew died on the day of arrival suffering from severe scurvy and exhaustion - Frederick Lockham of Hull and Gideon Fraser of Papa Stour.  Three further crew died in the following days - Hercules "Haslas" Anderson, John Thompson and Alexander Robertson - all Shetlanders.

Multiple references are made to the kindness received by the crew from those who came to their aid. One of the two crew who was able to go above deck upon entering Ronas Voe told The Scotsman: The people in the neighbourhood were uncommonly kind: I never met with so much attention in all my life. They would have done anything for us, and sent on board men to help us, and supplied us with all kinds of provisions. When I left the ship to come to Lerwick with the news of our arrival, a gentleman close by gave me his own topcoat to travel in, and I found the good of it too. Allen Young wrote in The Cornhill Magazine at the time:With the aid of help from the shore the ship was brought safely to anchor, and a message dispatched to Lerwick for assistance. The kind people of the neighbourhood sent off refreshments, and every attention was given to the poor worn-out sailors, who speak with the greatest gratitude of all the kindness they received.

Diana was kept in Ronas Voe for a week where it was provided for by the locals in terms of victuals, repair work and seven hundredweight of coal to allow stoves to be reheated. On 8 April, a further eight tons of coal sent from Lerwick arrived and was loaded by the locals. The next day, Diana raised anchor and was directed to Tofts Voe, and in the following days onward through Yell Sound to Dury Voe and Lerwick.

Fishing

Haaf 
Ronas Voe had a fishing station that was in use during the Haaf era, and 4 or 5 boats operated from it, however this was quite small in comparison to other stations in Northmavine, such as Stenness (between 40 and 50 boats) and Fethaland (about 60 boats).

Herring 
Ronas Voe saw significant activity during the herring boom. In 1891, there were 10 herring curers listed as operating out of Ronas Voe:

By 1905, there were 11:

Whaling 
Two Norwegian whaling stations were constructed in Ronas Voe in the beginning of the 20th Century - the Zetland Whale Fishing Company and the Norrona Whale Fishing Company opened in April and June 1903 respectively, and operated until 1914. While some work was made available for the locals, there was push-back against the factories due to the smell of the operations and pollution left upon the nearby beaches. Those engaged in the herring fishing also believed that the waste products of processing the whales (some of which ended up in the sea) attracted sharks that frightened off the herring shoals. A committee to investigate these claims was set up in 1904, however it wasn't able to determine a connection between the whaling and a downturn in the herring catch.

Economics

Jenny Gilbertson films 

Jenny Gilbertson was one of the world's first female documentary filmmakers. Four of her earliest productions were filmed in Ronas Voe, often involving the Clark family, their croft and their house. Two of her feature-length films - A crofter's life in Shetland and The rugged island; a Shetland lyric contain scenes filmed in Ronas Voe, while the short films Scenes from a Shetland croft life and In sheep's clothing were filmed entirely in Ronas Voe.

For The rugged island, the abandoned Timna crofthouse was repaired for the purpose of filming, however it was not intended for use as a dwelling and so was never lived in afterwards.

Aquaculture 

 there are 6 offshore aquaculture sites in Ronas Voe - 2 salmon farms administered by Scottish Sea Farms at Slocka and Pobie Sukka, and 4 long line common mussel farms administered by Blueshell Mussels at the Ayre of Teogs, the Clifts, and two at the head of the voe named Ronas Voe (North) and Ronas Voe (South).

Other 
As of 2019 Ronas Voe is regularly used as a practice site for the Coastguard Search & Rescue helicopter, which often lands at the Loch of Shun.

Ronas Voe is a popular destination for canoeing and kayaking due to its relatively sheltered situation, its impressive cliffs and numerous sea caves on the west coast.

Culture 
Ronas Voe is the name of a traditional Shetland waltz tune composed by Ronnie Cooper. Often played in a set followed by Sunset over Foula, it is regularly played at functions and traditional dances throughout Shetland and the rest of Scotland, and is often used as the music for a St Bernard's Waltz.

Scenes shot in Ronas Voe briefly appeared in the Shetland TV series.

Notes

References

Sources 

 
 
 
 

 
 
 
 
  Alt URL
 
 
 
 
 
 
 
 
 
 
 
 
 
 
 
 

 
 
 
 
 
 
 
 
 
 
 
 
 
 
 
 

 
 
 
 

 
 
 
 
 
 
 

 

Inlets of Scotland
Voes of Shetland
Fjords of Scotland
Sea lochs of Scotland
Northmavine
Whaling in Scotland
Fishing communities in Scotland